Max Braun (March 12, 1883 – May 1967 in Miami) was an American tug of war competitor and Olympic medalist. He competed in the 1904 Summer Olympics in St. Louis, where he received a silver medal.

References

External links

1883 births
1967 deaths
Olympic tug of war competitors of the United States
Tug of war competitors at the 1904 Summer Olympics
Olympic silver medalists for the United States in tug of war
Medalists at the 1904 Summer Olympics